Michael Fred Adams (born March 25, 1948) is president emeritus of the University of Georgia in the U.S. state of Georgia.

Adams began his career in education as a faculty member at Ohio State University from 1973 to 1975. He later served as vice president for university affairs at Pepperdine University from 1982 to 1988. After his tenure at Pepperdine, Adams was president of Centre College in Danville, Kentucky for nine years, 1988–1997. During his tenure at Centre, the endowment tripled to $120 million, faculty salaries nearly doubled and Centre was usually first in the nation in percentage of alumni making donations to the school each year.

Starting in 1997, Adams served as president of the University of Georgia. Under Adams' leadership, the university has increased total enrollment from 29,000 to nearly 35,000 and constructed or renovated a number of buildings and facilities, including an expansion of the Georgia Museum of Art, a new special collections library, newly relocated art school and science research facilities, and expansion of the university's Tate Student Center. The College of Engineering, College of Public Health and UGA-GHSU Medical Partnership have been established under Adams's tenure.

Adams has received more than 50 awards in higher education, including the Knight Foundation Award for Presidential Leadership, the Pioneer Award for Leadership in Civil Rights and the James T. Rogers Award from the Southern Association of Colleges and Schools. He received the Governor's Award in the Humanities from the Georgia Endowment for the Humanities. He has also been elected to lead a number of national education organizations, including the National Association of Independent Colleges and Universities, the Association of Public and Land-grant Universities, the American Council on Education, and the National Collegiate Athletic Association's Executive Committee. Adams was selected as the recipient of the 2013 Chief Executive Leadership Award from the Council for Advancement and Support of Education District III.

Before entering higher education, Adams held a number of political positions. He served as chief of staff for Senate Minority Leader Howard Baker 1975–1979 and as an aide to Governor Lamar Alexander of Tennessee from 1980 to 1982.  Adams was the Republican nominee for the United States House of Representatives in 1980 for Tennessee's Fifth District, but he lost the general election to Democrat Bill Boner 118,506 votes (65.4%) to 62,746 (34.6%)

In May 2012, Adams announced that he was stepping down as president of the University of Georgia after 16 years. He said he plans to continue to be involved with the Athens community and teach and write at UGA as well as fundraise for the university. The president's retirement took effect June 30, 2013.

Education
Adams graduated from Chattanooga High School.  Adams holds a B.A. in speech and history from David Lipscomb College, 1970; M.A. in communication research methodologies from Ohio State University in 1971; and a Ph.D. in political communication from Ohio State University in 1973. To support himself during the OSU years, he served as minister at the Indian Springs Church of Christ in Columbus. In May 2012, Adams announced that he would be stepping down as UGA president the following year.

Struggles and Controversies
In the summer of 2002 President Adams claimed to have been offered the presidency of Ohio State University and a salary between $850,000 and $1,000,000. Adams submitted to the UGA foundation a letter allegedly turning down the offer and asked for the foundation to match it. In response, the foundation increased Adams's salary. After reading published reports of this alleged offer James Patterson, chair of Ohio State's presidential search committee, "flatly denied" that Adams was either a candidate or a finalist for the position.

In October 2003, a forensic audit by Deloitte & Touche, LLP criticized Adams's stewardship. Charges included but were not limited to (i) expenditures for which Adams later reimbursed the University of Georgia, (ii) a stipend given to his wife, Mary, (iii) Adams's oversight of the purchase of an ecolodge in Costa Rica, (iv) and a secret payment by Adams to former football coach Jim Donnan.

In March 2004 the faculty senate of the Franklin College of Arts and Sciences, the largest college in the University of Georgia, passed a vote of "no confidence" in Adams.  Additionally, in a 2004 statement the faculty senate expressed concern about the decline in excellence during Adams' tenure.

Athletics Involvement
Adams has served as the chair both of the Southeastern Conference and the NCAA. During his tenure as President of the University of Georgia, he was heavily involved in the UGA athletics department.

Advocacy of NCAA football playoff 
On January 8, 2008, Adams made national news when, as chairman of the NCAA executive committee, he advocated establishing an eight-team playoff for an NCAA football national championship. Adams, citing the influence of the television networks and commissioners of the various conferences and bowls, noted that some recent BCS matchups had been disappointing and stated that the BCS system was "undercutting the sportsmanship and integrity of the game."

UGA Athletics Controversies 
Adam's involvement with UGA athletics at time pitted him against the UGA athletic director and many fans. Notably, in 2000 Adams fired Jim Donnan despite Donnan's winning record and the backing of UGA athletics director Vince Dooley. Adams came under further fan scrutiny for shortening Dooley's contract from four to two years.   Dooley had worked for four other UGA presidents and had spent nearly 40 years as coach or athletic director for UGA. This was met by protests from fans upset at Dooley's early termination. Members of the UGA Foundation, which fundraises money for the university, tried to push Adams out over his handling of Dooley's firing.  Adams also hired and oversaw the basketball program coached by Jim Harrick. An academic scandal led by Harrick's son caused Adams to pull UGA's team from possible post season competition.

References

Notes

  William Prokasy, UGA's Vice-President of Academic Affairs at the time, served as the interim UGA president for 3 months from the time of Knapp's departure in the spring of 1997 until Michael Adams's official start in the fall of that same year.

External links
 Biography from University of Georgia
 Biography from Centre College
 ESPN article on advocacy of football playoff

Living people
People from Montgomery, Alabama
Presidents of the University of Georgia
Lipscomb University alumni
Ohio State University faculty
Pepperdine University faculty
People from Danville, Kentucky
Presidents of Centre College
1948 births
American members of the Churches of Christ
People from Athens, Georgia
Tennessee Republicans
Ohio State University School of Communication alumni